Dave Huxtable (born December 20, 1956) is an American football coach who is the senior defensive assistant for the Atlanta Falcons of the National Football League (NFL). He served as the defensive coordinator at the North Carolina State University from 2013 to 2019. He previously served as the defensive coordinator of the Pittsburgh Panthers football team.

Coaching career
Huxtable began his coaching career as a graduate assistant with the Iowa State Cyclones in 1982 before serving as the defensive coordinator at Independence Community College. After being a member of the Western Kentucky Hilltoppers staff from 1985 to 1989, he coached linebackers and special teams with the East Carolina Pirates from 1990 to 1991. During that time, he coached linebacker Robert Jones, who was later selected in the first round of the 1992 NFL Draft by the Dallas Cowboys. From 1992 to 1997, Huxtable was a member of the Georgia Tech Yellow Jackets. He was the linebackers coach during his entire tenure, also serving as special teams coordinator from 1992 to 1994 and defensive coordinator from 1996 to 1997. While with the Yellow Jackets, he coach linebacker Keith Brooking, who was later selected in the first round of the 1998 NFL Draft by the Atlanta Falcons. Following his time with Georgia Tech, Huxtable returned to East Carolina for two seasons, serving as linebackers coach in 1998 and defensive line coach in 1999. After a year away from coaching, he was a member of the North Carolina Tar Heels staff from 2001 to 2003. Again, he was linebackers coach during his entire tenure, also serving as special teams coordinator in 2001 and defensive coordinator from 2002 to 2003. He then joined the UCF Knights, serving as linebackers coach and special teams coordinator from 2004 to 2007 and defensive coordinator from 2008 to 2010.

Pittsburgh
In 2012, Huxtable left his position as linebackers coach at Wisconsin to become the defensive coordinator at the University of Pittsburgh.

NC State
In 2013, Huxtable joined the staff at North Carolina State University, serving as defensive coordinator under head coach Dave Doeren. On December 2, 2019, Huxtable was relieved of his duties after the Wolfpack's 4–7 season, in which Huxtable's defense ranked 74th nationally.

Atlanta Falcons
In 2023, Huxtable was hired away from the Alabama Crimson Tide Football to be a defensive assistant with the Atlanta Falcons. This will be his first coaching job in the NFL

Personal
Huxtable is a graduate of Eastern Illinois University. He is married with two children and is a native of Elgin, Illinois.

References

External links
 NC State profile
 UCF profile

1956 births
Living people
East Carolina Pirates football coaches
Georgia Tech Yellow Jackets football coaches
Iowa State Cyclones football coaches
Junior college football coaches in the United States
NC State Wolfpack football coaches
North Carolina Tar Heels football coaches
Oklahoma State Cowboys football coaches
Sportspeople from Elgin, Illinois
Pittsburgh Panthers football coaches
UCF Knights football coaches
Western Kentucky Hilltoppers football coaches
Wisconsin Badgers football coaches
Eastern Illinois University alumni
Coaches of American football from Illinois
Alabama Crimson Tide football coaches